Sharon E. McKay (born 1954) is a Canadian author of novels and graphic novels for children and young adults, that often focus on children going through hardships throughout the world. She was born in 1954 in Montreal, Quebec, and earned a B.A. from York University in 1978. She lives in Prince Edward Island.

Awards
McKay is the recipient of several literary awards.  The novel Charlie Wilcox won the Geoffrey Bilson Award and the Violet Downey Award. The novel End of The Line won the 2015 Ann Connor Brimer Award and the Hackmatack award. The novel War Brothers won the   Arthur Ellis Award for Best Juvenile or Young Adult Crime Book in 2010. The novel Prison Boy won the Ann Connor Brimer Award for Children's Literature.

Bibliography

 Charlie Wilcox (2000)
 Charlie Wilcox's Great War (2002)
 Esther (2004)
 War Brothers (2009)
 Thunder Over Kandahar (2010)
 Enemy Territory (2012)
 War Brothers, The Graphic Novel (2014)
 The End of the Line (2015)
 Prison Boy (2015)

 Our Canadian Girl: Penelope series

 Penelope: Terror in the Harbour (2002)
 Penelope: The Glass Castle (2002)
 Penelope: An Irish Penny (2003)
 Penelope: Christmas Reunion (2004)

References

External links
 

1954 births
Living people
Anglophone Quebec people
Canadian children's writers
Canadian women children's writers
Canadian writers of young adult literature
Women writers of young adult literature
Writers from Montreal